Nearcha dasyzona is a moth of the family Geometridae first described by Oswald Bertram Lower in 1903. It is found in Australia.

References

Oenochrominae
Moths described in 1903